Ice hockey has been contested as a sport in the Winter Deaflympics since 1975. In the Winter Deaflympic history, ice hockey has been contested only for men on 7 occasions (1975,1991,1995,1999,2003,2007 and 2015).

In the inaugural men's ice hockey tournament, only Canada and United States were eligible to compete way back in 1975.

Canada and United States have been the most successful nations as they have won the most number of medals in the sporting event since 1975. Both US and Canada are the only teams to win medals in the ice hockey competitions they have competed.

Medal winners

Medal table

References 

Ice Hockey
Ice hockey at multi-sport events